Cyperus trichodes is a species of sedge that is native to parts of Jamaica.

See also 
 List of Cyperus species

References 

trichodes
Plants described in 1864
Flora of Jamaica
Taxa named by August Grisebach